Airidh a' Bhruaich (Arivruaich - anglicised) is a scattered crofting township in the South Lochs district of the Isle of Lewis in the Outer Hebrides of Scotland.  It lies at the head of the sea loch of Loch Seaforth.

External links
 

Villages in the Isle of Lewis